Amite High Magnet School is a public high school in Amite City, Louisiana, United States. It is governed by the Tangipahoa Parish School Board.

Haynesville Senior High athletics competes in the LHSAA.

Athletics
Amite High athletics competes in the LHSAA.

Championships
Football championships
(6) State Championships: 1963, 1994, 1999, 2004, 2018, 2021

Notable alumni
 P. J. Franklin, former NFL player
 Cletis Gordon, former NFL player
 Kevin Hughes, former NFL player
 Aaron Morgan, former NFL player
 Reggie Porter, former NFL player
 Alan Ricard, former NFL player
 DeVonta Smith, the 2020 Heisman Trophy Winner. Currently a member of the Philadelphia Eagles. In 2020, DeVonta became the first wide receiver to be voted the Associated Press College Football Player of the Year.

References

External links
 Amite High Magnet School

Public high schools in Louisiana
Schools in Tangipahoa Parish, Louisiana